= Strana Ochrany Prav Romov =

Slovak political party

Strana Ochrany Prav Romov is a political party in Slovakia which defends the rights of the Romani people.
